Long Island is an island in Fiordland, in the southwest of New Zealand's South Island. It lies within Dusky Sound, to the southeast of Resolution Island, and is separated from it and the South island mainland by Bowen Channel to the north, and from the South Island mainland by Cook Channel to the south.

The island is part of Fiordland National Park and is the fourth-largest island in the park with no possums present.

See also

 Desert island
 List of islands

References

Reed New Zealand Atlas (2004). Auckland: Reed Books. Map 104.

Uninhabited islands of New Zealand
Islands of Fiordland
Fiordland National Park